Sarel Wolmarans (born 24 April 1973) is a South African cricketer. He played in seven List A matches for Boland in 1998/99.

See also
 List of Boland representative cricketers

References

External links
 

1973 births
Living people
South African cricketers
Boland cricketers